Slup (also known as Слуп in Cyrillic and also transliterated as Sllup and sometimes Sllupi) is a village in the Deçan Municipality, District of Gjakova, Kosovo.

Notes
Notes:

References

Villages in Deçan